Steve Peters (born 1961) is an American independent game designer and experience designer specializing in alternate reality games and transmedia storytelling. Steve was Chief Creative Officer at No Mimes Media, an Alternate Reality Game company which he co-founded with Maureen McHugh and Behnam Karbassi in March 2009. From 2011 to 2012, he was VP of Experience Design at Fourth Wall Studios, where he was Lead Experience Designer for their Emmy® Award-Winning series Dirty Work, among others. From 2012 through 2017, he hosted the StoryForward Podcast, a show that explored the future of storytelling and entertainment.

From July 2006 to December 2008, he worked with 42 Entertainment as Experience Designer, Game Designer and/or Community Manager. Projects on which he worked while at 42 Entertainment included Why So Serious (for the film The Dark Knight), Year Zero (for the Nine Inch Nails album Year Zero), The Vanishing Point (Microsoft's Vista Release), Dead Man's Tale (for the film Pirates of the Caribbean II: Dead Man's Chest), and Last Call Poker (Activision's Game Gun).

In 2003, Steve was a designer for Metacortechs (an independent alternate reality game based in the Matrix universe), and founded the Alternate Reality Gaming Network (now ARGNet) in 2002.

Select Credits
 Mesmer & Braid (Alternate Reality Game): Co-Designer (2020)
 Twenty One Pilots' Level of Concern (Alternate Reality Game): ARG Experience Designer (2020)
 Blackout Interactive Series: Transmedia Experience Designer (2019)
 The Quest for the Golden Bananas (Global Treasure Hunt): Lead Experience Designer (2018)
 Endgame: Ancient Societies (Alternate Reality Game): Experience Designer (2015)
 Dark Detour: Creator, Writer, Experience Designer (2014, 2015)
 Redrum: Lead Experience Designer (2013)
 RVC: VP of Experience Design (2013)
 Dirty Work: Transmedia Design (2012)
 Meridian: Experience Designers, Transmedia Creative Director, Transmedia Design (2012)
 6:14: VP of Experience Design (2012)
 Whispers: VP of Experience Design (2012)
 Flare: VP of Experience Design (2012)
 Airship Dracula: VP of Experience Design (2012)
 The Swarming: Transmedia Design (2012)
 Claire: Experience Designer (2012)
 The Gamblers: VP of Experience Design (2012)
 Goldfish Theatre: Lead Experience Designer (2012)
 Home: A Ghost Story: Senior Experience Designer, Transmedia Design (2012)
 Webishades (Alternate Reality Game): Lead Experience Designer (2010)
 The Hunt (Alternate Reality Game): Lead Experience Designer (2010)
 Mime Academy (Alternate Reality Game): Lead Experience Designer (2009)
 The Threshold (Alternate Reality Game): Lead Experience Designer (2009)
 6 Minutes to Midnight (Alternate Reality Game): Experience Designer (2009)
 Why So Serious (Alternate Reality Game): Designer (2008)
 Year Zero (Alternate Reality Game): Designer (2007)
 The Vanishing Point (Alternate Reality Game): Designer (2007)
 Dead Man's Tale: Designer (2006)
 Last Call Poker (Alternate Reality Game): Independent Design Contractor (2005)
 Metacortechs (Alternate Reality Game): Designer (2003)

External links

Websites
 StevePeters.org
 Steve's IMDb entry

Writing Contributions
 This is Not a Game (contributing author)
 Space Time Play (contributing author)
 The Reality Games (puzzle and cipher consultant)

Interviews
Transmedia.ca: Steve Peters Interview 2012
Popular Mechanics: Epic Win: The World's Most Lavish Gaming Gifts 2009
WIRED: Secret Websites, Coded Messages: The New World of Immersive Games 2007
ARGNetcast: The Steve Peters Experience 2006
Geekson Podcast: Steve Peters talks about a new geek art form 2006
BNet: Bees, ARGs, and the Birth of the Collective Detective 2005
Globe and Mail Canada:Advertisers reap real-world benefits from 'alternate reality' 2005
ABC Radio Australia: Alternate Reality 2004
Wired: I Love Bees Game a Surprise Hit 2004
G4 TV: I Love Bees Mystery Continues (video) 2004

References

1961 births
American game designers
Living people
People from Los Angeles
Alternate reality games
Transmediation